Gary March is an Australian investor, the founder and former director of Concept Sports International, now known as Beyond Sportswear Limited and former president of the Richmond Football Club until 2013.

Gary took over the presidency from Clinton Casey in 2005, after being on the Richmond Board of Directors since 2002. He was replaced by Peggy O'Neal (lawyer) in late 2013.

References

Australian businesspeople
Richmond Football Club administrators
Living people
Year of birth missing (living people)